Darcy Clarence Hadfield (1 December 1889 – 15 September 1964) was a New Zealand rower who won a bronze medal at the 1920 Summer Olympics in Antwerp. In doing so, he became the first Olympic medallist who represented New Zealand; previous New Zealand medallists had represented Australasia. Subsequently he became the third New Zealander to hold the professional World Sculling Championship.

Biography

Hadfield was born in Awaroa Inlet, Tasman Bay and moved to Auckland at the age of 21. He won the New Zealand single sculls title in three consecutive years, 1913–1915. In 1916 he married Sarita May Cowper. He joined the army and served in World War I where he was wounded in the head.

After the war Hadfield competed at the Inter-Allied Games where he won the single sculls. The same year, 1919, he won the Kingswood Cup for single sculls at the 1919 Henley Regatta. He was then part of the first separate New Zealand Olympic team and was the only medallist.

In 1922 Hadfield turned professional and won the World Sculling Title on the Wanganui River on 5 January.

After retiring from competitive international rowing Hadfield was involved many aspects of the sport until his death in 1964. In 1990 he was inducted into the New Zealand Sports Hall of Fame.

References

Further reading 

 Richard Arnst, The Single Sculls World Champion From New Zealand, published 2005.

1889 births
1964 deaths
New Zealand male rowers
Olympic rowers of New Zealand
Olympic bronze medalists for New Zealand
Rowers at the 1920 Summer Olympics
New Zealand military personnel of World War I
Olympic medalists in rowing
Medalists at the 1920 Summer Olympics